Father Goose may refer to:

Arts and entertainment
 Father Goose (film), a 1964 World War II movie starring Cary Grant and Leslie Caron
 Father Goose, an alternate title of Fly Away Home, a 1996 film
 Father Goose, a character in some of L. Frank Baum's books
 Father Goose: His Book, a collection of nonsense poetry for children by L. Frank Baum
 Father Goose, a book by Chapman Mortimer that won the 1951 James Tait Black Memorial Prize for fiction
 Father Goose, a fictional character on the TV series On My Block

People
 "Father Goose", pen name and registered trademark of poet and children's author Charles Ghigna
 "Father Goose", professional name of children's music artist Wayne Rhoden

See also
 Gireogi appa, a Korean term literally translated as "goose dad"
 Mother Goose